"Calling" / "Breathless" is the 40th single released by Japanese boy band Arashi. "Calling" was used as the theme song for the drama Last Hope starring Arashi member Masaki Aiba. "Breathless" was used as the theme song for the movie Platina Data starring Arashi member Kazunari Ninomiya.

It debuted at number one on the Oricon Singles Chart. According to Oricon, this was the sixth best selling single of the year in Japan, with 881,192 copies.

Single information
The single was released in three editions: a regular edition and two limited editions. The regular edition includes the two A-sides, two bonus tracks, and the karaoke version of all the songs. Limited edition A includes a bonus DVD with the music video for "Calling" while limited edition B includes a bonus DVD with the music video for "Breathless". Both limited editions also include a 12-page lyrics booklet.

Composition
The music for "Calling" was written by Andreas Johansson and Youwhich. The lyrics were written by s-Tnk and Eltvo. A writer from CDJournal described "Calling" as a "rocking number". The song features edgy synths that accent a heavy band sound. "Breathless" was composed by Takuya Harada, Christofer Erixon, and Joakim Björnberg, with lyrics by Hydrant. CDJournal described it as a cool dance tune that also has hard elements.

Track listing

See also
 List of Oricon number-one singles of 2013

References

External links
 Calling/Breathless product information

2013 singles
Arashi songs
Oricon Weekly number-one singles
J Storm singles
Japanese film songs